Cristoforo Buondelmonti (c. 1385 – c. 1430) was an Italian Franciscan priest and traveler, and a pioneer in promoting first-hand knowledge of Greece and its antiquities throughout the Western world.

Biography
Cristoforo Buondelmonti was born around 1385 into an important Florentine family. He was taught Greek by Guarino da Verona and received further education from Niccolò Niccoli, an influential Florentine humanist. By 1414 he had become a priest and served as a rector of a church in Florence.

He left his native city around 1414 in order to travel, mainly in the Aegean Islands. He visited Constantinople in the 1420s. He is the author of two historical-geographic works: the Descriptio insulae Cretae (1417, in collaboration with Niccolò Niccoli) and the Liber insularum Archipelagi (1420). These two books are a combination of geographical information and contemporary charts and sailing directions. The latter one contains the oldest surviving map of Constantinople, and the only one which antedates the Ottoman conquest of the city in 1453.

While travelling over the island of Andros, he bought a Greek manuscript and brought it back with him to Italy. This was the Hieroglyphica of Horapollo, which played a considerable role both in humanistic thinking and in art.

See also
The Buondelmonti, a noble family of Florence

References

Sources

G. Gerola, "Le vedute di Costantinopoli di Cristoforo Buondelmonti," SBN 3 (1931): 247–79.
Cristoforo Buondelmonti, 

1386 births
1430s deaths
Clergy from Florence
Italian travel writers
Italian male non-fiction writers
15th-century Italian writers
15th-century travel writers
15th-century Italian cartographers
Medieval travel writers
Writers from Florence
Cristoforo